The Minister of Urban Affairs is a former cabinet position in Manitoba, Canada.

The position was created in the early 1970s, incorporating responsibilities that had previously been held by the Minister of Municipal Affairs.  It was discontinued by the government of Gary Doer in 1999.

List of Ministers of Urban Affairs

Note: From 1966 to 1968, Thelma Forbes was designated as Minister of Urban Development and Municipal Affairs.
From 1971 to 1972, Sidney Green served as Minister responsible for Urban Affairs.  This was not a full cabinet portfolio, although Green was already a member of cabinet by virtue of being Minister of Mines, Resources and Environmental Management.
From 1978 to 1979, Gerald Mercier was designated as Minister of Municipal and Urban Affairs.
Linda McIntosh was designated as Minister of Urban Affairs and Housing.

Sources:  , 

Urban Affairs, Minister of